The Women's State of Origin is an annual rugby league fixture between two Australian state representative women's sides, the New South Wales Blues and the Queensland Maroons.

First played in 1999 as the Women's Interstate Challenge, the game was rebranded as State of Origin for the 2018 season. Queensland won the first game in 1999 and were unbeaten for 17 years until New South Wales won for the first time in 2016.

History

Women's Interstate Challenge (1999–2017)
Despite women's rugby league first being played in Australia in 1921, the first official game between Queensland and New South Wales was not held until 1999. The two teams met at Brisbane's ANZ Stadium with Queensland winning 16–6.

Accurate records were not kept in the early years of the Interstate Challenge by either the QRL or the NSWRL, with many player records and game information still unknown. For many years, the women's teams were run by their own governing bodies, the Queensland Women's Rugby League and the New South Wales Women's rugby league, who were affiliated with the QRL and NSWRL.

Before coming under the State of Origin banner in 2018, the sides were not known as the 'Blues' and 'Maroons', with the Queensland side being known as the 'Brolgas'. In 2005, the teams began playing for the Nellie Doherty Cup. Nellie Doherty was a pioneer of the women's game in Australia, helping to launch the sport in 1921.

Although the majority of early Women's Interstate Challenges were one-off fixtures, the sides would occasionally play a series of games, such as in 2004 and 2008.

In 2015, Queensland failed to defeat New South Wales for the first time, with the sides drawing 4–all at Townsville's 1300SMILES Stadium and Queensland retaining the Nellie Doherty Cup. On 23 July 2016, New South Wales defeated Queensland for the first time, ending Queensland's 17-year undefeated streak, with an 8–4 victory at the Gold Coast's Cbus Super Stadium. On 23 July 2017, in the final game played under the Women's Interstate Challenge name, New South Wales defeated Queensland for the second time, winning 22–6 at WIN Stadium in Wollongong.

State of Origin (2018–present)
On 6 December 2017, the National Rugby League announced that the Women's Interstate Challenge would be rebranded as the Women's State of Origin. The game which, was previously played as a curtain-raiser, would now be a standalone fixture broadcast on the Nine Network and Fox Sports. With the game under the State of Origin banner, the Nellie Doherty Cup was replaced by a shield, with the player of the match now receiving the Nellie Doherty Medal.

On 22 June 2018, New South Wales won the first Women's State of Origin game, defeating Queensland 16–10 at North Sydney Oval. Blues' centre Isabelle Kelly, who scored two tries in the win, won the inaugural Nellie Doherty Medal. On 21 June 2019, New South Wales defeated Queensland for the fourth consecutive year, winning 14–4 at North Sydney Oval, with Blues halfback Maddie Studdon being awarded the Nellie Doherty Medal.

The 2020 game was originally due to be played in June at Sunshine Coast Stadium, but was moved to the post-season for the first time, due to the COVID-19 pandemic. The game was played in Queensland for the first time under the State of Origin banner and for the first time overall since 2016. Queensland defeated New South Wales 24–18, winning their first official State of Origin game and their first game since 2014.

The 2021 match is historically notable for being the first Women's State of Origin fixture where the players, coaches and on-field officials were all women.

Broadcasting
Within Australia, the game is simulcast on the Nine Network and Fox Sports.

In 2013 and 2014, the game was livestreamed. In 2015 and 2016, the game aired on Fox Sports as a replay the day after the game. In 2017, the game aired live on Fox Sports for the first time.

Selection rules
 
 
Prior to 2019, the Queensland and New South Wales teams were largely selected under residency rules, meaning a number of players represented both states. For example, Tahnee Norris (who captained Queensland) and Natalie Dwyer, both represented New South Wales before moving to Queensland. Innisfail's Tarah Westera represented Queensland before moving to Penrith, where she represented New South Wales, later returning and playing for Queensland.

In 2019, the eligibility rules were revised to be more inline with the men's State of Origin rules. The residency rule was removed, which saw New Zealand representatives Maitua Feterika (Queensland) and Nita Maynard (New South Wales) ruled ineligible. Queensland  Rona Peters, who had previously represented New Zealand, was also originally ruled ineligible. This was later overturned and she was given special dispensation, as she had retired from international rugby league in 2015, before she first represented Queensland in 2016.

Nellie Doherty Medal
The Nellie Doherty Medal is awarded to the player of the match. The medal was first awarded in 2018 to New South Wales'  Isabelle Kelly after the first official Women's State of Origin game and Kelly became the first player to win the award twice winning it again in 2022

Results
Accurate records were not kept in early years of the Women's Interstate Challenge by either the QRL or the NSWRL. In 2004 and 2008 two games were played instead of a one-off fixture.

Match Details

2006

2007

2008 
Game 1 

 
Game 2

2009

2010

2011

2012

2013

2014

2015

2016

2017

2018

2019

2020

2021

2022

See also

NRL Women's Premiership
NSWRL Women's Premiership
QRL Women's Premiership
State of Origin series
Rugby league in Australia
Australian regional rivals – NSW vs. QLD

References

External links
 Women's Rugby League news section

 
1999 establishments in Australia
Women's rugby league competitions in Australia
Rugby league rivalries
Rugby league in Queensland
Rugby league in New South Wales
Annual sporting events in Australia
Recurring sporting events established in 1999
Sports leagues established in 1999
Nine's Wide World of Sport
Sports rivalries in Australia
Winter events in Australia